Nomifensine (Merital, Alival) is a norepinephrine-dopamine reuptake inhibitor, i.e. a drug that increases the amount of synaptic norepinephrine and dopamine available to receptors by blocking the dopamine and norepinephrine reuptake transporters. This is a mechanism of action shared by some recreational drugs like cocaine and the medication tametraline (see DRI). Research showed that the (S)-isomer is responsible for activity.

The drug was developed in the 1960s by Hoechst AG (now Sanofi-Aventis), who then test marketed it in the United States. It was an effective antidepressant, without sedative effects. Nomifensine did not interact significantly with alcohol and lacked anticholinergic effects. No withdrawal symptoms were seen after 6 months treatment. The drug was however considered not suitable for agitated patients as it presumably made agitation worse. In January 1986 the drug was withdrawn by its manufacturers for safety reasons.

Some case reports in the 1980s suggested that there was potential for psychological dependence on nomifensine, typically in patients with a history of stimulant addiction, or when the drug was used in very high doses (400–600 mg per day).

In a 1989 study it was investigated for use in treating adult ADHD and proven effective. In a 1977 study it has not proven of benefit in advanced parkinsonism, except for depression associated with the parkinsonism.

Clinical uses
Nomifensine was investigated for use as an antidepressant in the 1970s, and was found to be a useful antidepressant at doses of 50–225 mg per day, both motivating and anxiolytic.

Side effects and withdrawal from market
During treatment with nomifensine there were relatively few adverse effects, mainly renal failure, paranoid symptoms, drowsiness or insomnia, headache, and dry mouth. Side effects affecting the cardiovascular system included tachycardia and palpitations, but nomifensine was significantly less cardiotoxic than the standard tricyclic antidepressants.

Due to a risk of haemolytic anaemia, the U.S. Food and Drug Administration (FDA) withdrew approval for nomifensine on March 20, 1992. Nomifensine was subsequently withdrawn from the Canadian and UK markets as well. Some deaths were linked to immunohaemolytic anemia caused by this compound, although the mechanism remained unclear.

In 2012 structure-affinity relationship data (compare SAR) were published.

Synthesis
Note that nomifensine was a Progenitor to Gastrophenazine. See also: Isatin derivatives.

The alkylation between N-methyl-2-nitrobenzylamine [56222-08-3] (1) and phenacyl bromide  (2) gives CID:15326127 (3). Catalytic hydrogenation over Raney Nickel reduces the nitro group to give CID:15113381 (4). The reduction of the ketone group with sodium borohydride to alcohol gives [65514-97-8] (5). Acid catalysed ring closure completes the formation of nomifensine (6).

See also 
 Amineptine
 Diclofensine
 Perafensine
 The combination of Clobazam / nomifensine is called Psyton [75963-47-2].

References 

Anilines
Antidepressants
Hepatotoxins
Norepinephrine–dopamine reuptake inhibitors
Stimulants
Tetrahydroisoquinolines
Withdrawn drugs